The 1954 Stanford Indians football team represented Stanford University in the 1954 college football season. The team was led by Chuck Taylor in his fourth year. The team played their home games at Stanford Stadium in Stanford, California.

Stanford's loss to San Jose State was the team's first-ever loss in the rivalry series that began in 1900. The team's 72–0 loss to UCLA remains Stanford's largest-ever margin of defeat.

Schedule

Players drafted by the NFL

References

Stanford
Stanford Cardinal football seasons
Stanford Indians football